Justin Sedlák (born 14 January 1955) is a Slovak basketball player. He competed in the men's tournament at the 1976 Summer Olympics.

References

1955 births
Living people
Slovak men's basketball players
Olympic basketball players of Czechoslovakia
Basketball players at the 1976 Summer Olympics
People from Zlaté Moravce District
Sportspeople from the Nitra Region